Zawiślak (feminine Zawiślakowa or Zawiślakówna) is a Polish surname. It is a topographic surname referring to someone who lived "over the Vistula".
It may refer to:
 Andrzej Zawiślak (born 1937), Polish politician
 Sławomir Zawiślak (born 1963), Polish politician
 Dariusz Zawiślak (born 1972), artist

It is often anglicized to Zawislak or Zavislak.

Polish-language surnames